The Hang Tuah Stadium or Stadium Kubu is a multi-use stadium in Malacca City, Malacca, Malaysia. The stadium originally had a capacity of 15,000 with 1,000 seating capacity at a particular time. It is mostly used for football matches, previously as the home stadium for SAMB and as the second home stadium and training ground for Melaka United.

History
Stadium Hang Tuah is the oldest stadium in the state of Malacca. It was formerly known as the Stadium Kubu and was officially opened in 1954 by the honourable Mr. G.E.C Wisdom C.M.G., which at that time was the president commissioner of Malacca, president of the Municipal Council, and president of Malacca Stadium. At that time the stadium is under the management of Malacca Stadium Committee.

On 31 August 2001, the name was eventually changed to Stadium Hang Tuah. The launching ceremony was made by His Excellency Syed Ahmad Syed Mahmud Shahabuddin, Yang di-Pertua Negeri of Malacca.

On 1 June 2005, Stadium Hang Tuah management was transferred to Perbadanan Stadium Melaka from Malacca City Council (MBMB).

The stadium received a major renovation in 2012 when most of the older seating stand was destroyed in order to create an open space to promote "green area" in Malacca City centre.

The stadium was once again renovated in 2015, costing RM 3 million, when Frenz United Football Academy collaborated with local government to open their academy in Malacca. 

In 2019, SAMB has chosen the Stadium Hang Tuah as the club home stadium for its Liga M3 campaign.

Events
2010 Sukma Games
Liga Premier
Liga FAM
Piala Malaysia
Piala FA
Piala Presiden
 Mawlid procession

See also
 List of tourist attractions in Malacca
 Hang Jebat Stadium
 List of football stadiums in Malaysia

References

Football venues in Malaysia
Athletics (track and field) venues in Malaysia
Multi-purpose stadiums in Malaysia
Rugby union stadiums in Malaysia
Sports venues in Melaka
1954 establishments in Malaya
Melaka United F.C.
Sports venues completed in 1954